A fire-resistance rating typically means the duration for which a passive fire protection system can withstand a standard fire resistance test. This can be quantified simply as a measure of time, or it may entail other criteria, involving evidence of functionality or fitness for purpose.

Common rating systems
The following depict the most commonly used international time/temperature curves:

International fire-resistance ratings
There are many international variations for nearly countless types of products and systems, some with multiple test requirements.

Canada's Institute for Research in Construction (a part of the National Research Council and publisher of Canada's model building code - NBC) requires a special test regime for firestops for plastic pipe penetrants. Fire endurance tests for this application must be run under 50Pa positive furnace pressure in order to adequately simulate the effect of potential temperature differences between indoor and outdoor temperatures in Canada's winters. Special hoods are applied here to provide suction on the top side of a test assembly in order to reach the 50Pa pressure differential. Afterwards, a 30PSI hose-stream test may be applied.

Outdoor spray fireproofing methods that must be qualified to the hydrocarbon curve may be required to pass a host of environmental tests before any burn takes place, to minimize the likelihood of ordinary operational environments rendering a vital system component useless before it ever encounters a fire.

If critical environmental conditions are not satisfied, an assembly may not be eligible for a fire-resistance rating.

Regardless of the complexity of any given test regime that may lead to a rating, the premise is generally product certification and, most importantly listing and approval use and compliance. Testing without certification and installations that cannot be matched with an appropriate certification listing, are not usually recognised by any Authority Having Jurisdiction (AHJ) unless it is in a realm where product certification is optional.

Tests for fire resistance of record protection equipment
The following classifications may be attained when testing in accordance with UL 72.

Class 125 Rating
This rating is the requirement in data safes and vault structures for protecting digital information on magnetic media or hard drives.  Temperatures inside the protected chamber must be held below  for the time period specified, such as Class 125-2 Hour, with temperatures up to  outside the vault.  The temperature reading is taken on the inside surfaces of the protective structure. Maintaining the temperature below 125 °F is critical because data is lost above that temperature threshold, even if the media or hard drives appear to be intact.

Class 150 Rating
This is the rating required to protect microfilm, microfiche, and other film-based information storage media.  Above 150 °F (65.5 °C) film is distorted by the heat and information is lost.  A Class 150-2 Hour vault must keep the temperature below 150 °F. for at least two hours, with temperatures up to 2,000 °F. (1,093.3 °C) outside the vault.

Class 350 Rating
This rating is the requirement for protecting paper documents.  Above 350 °F (176.7 °C) paper is distorted by the heat and information is lost.  A Class 350-4 Hour vault must keep the temperature below 350 °F. for at least four hours, with temperatures up to 2,000 °F. (1,093.3 °C) outside the vault.

Different time/temperature curves
Typically, most countries use the building elements curve for residential and commercial spaces, which is nearly identical in most countries as that is what results by burning wood. The building elements curve is characterized jointly by, including, but not limited to, DIN4102, BS476, ASTM E119, ULC-S101, etc. For industrial facilities in the hydrocarbon & petrochemical industries, a hydrocarbon curve (such as UL 1709) is used, reflecting a more rapid temperature rise. The only commonly used exposure beyond this, apart from the more recent tunnel curves shown above, would be the jet fire exposure standards such as ISO 22899, which are used where equipment may be subject to the extreme heat and momentum effects of jet fire exposure.

Big differences between different countries in terms of the use of the curves include the use of pipes, which shield the furnace thermocouples inside of NAFTA testing laboratories. This slows down the response time and results in a somewhat more conservative test regime in North America. On the other hand, the ISO based European curves run somewhat hotter for most of the test. North America also selectively uses a hose-stream test between 30 and 45PSI, to simulate real-world impacts and damages that may not be simulated in a laboratory. The US Navy even insists on a 90PSI hose-stream test for some of its assemblies, which may simulate the pressure available to firefighters in fighting a fire, but which has little to do with countermeasures against damaging effects of manual fire suppression. The hose-stream is simply intended to add a level of toughness to matters because without this, some fairly flimsy systems can pass a test, thus receive a rating and thus be permissible by a building code but be so weak that ordinary building use may damage a thus qualified system before it encounters a fire.

Germany's DIN4102 also includes a significant impact test for a potential firewall, which is, however, applied from the wrong side: the cold side. Applying the impact from the cold side is more practical to do in a lab setting, however, potential impacts should come from the exposed side, not the unexposed side. Still, for the person designing, building and paying for the test, the fire resistance itself may be rather uneventful unless major problems appear. The burn itself is the long duration, up to 4 hours, but the hose stream test only lasts a few minutes, with large damage potential due to the sudden thermal and kinetic impacts, as the fire was upwards of 1,100 °C (see curves above), whereas the sudden hose-stream test is as cold as the domestic water fed to the fire hose used in the test, which might be 10-20 °C. This combined impact explains the debris that can be seen coming from test specimens during the hose stream test, as seen herein.

Because of the large differences in test regimes all over the world, even for identical products and systems, organizations that intend to market their products internationally are often required to run many tests in many countries. Even where test regimes are identical, countries are often reluctant to accept the test results and particularly the certification methods of other countries.

During a fire in a tunnel, as well as in the petrochemical industry, temperatures exceed those of ordinary building (cellulosic) fires. This is because the fuel for the fire is hydrocarbons, which burn hotter (compare hydrocarbon curve above to ASTM E119 curve), faster and typically run out of fuel faster as well, compared against timber. The added complication with tunnels is that the environment inside a "tube" is best described as a "microclimate". The heat cannot escape as well as it can in a burning refinery, which is in the open. Instead, the fire is confined to a narrow tube, where pressure and heat build up and spread rapidly, with little room for escape and little chance of compartmentalization. This scenario was tested and quantified, particularly during the "Eureka Project", run by Technische Universität Braunschweig's iBMB, Ekkehard Richter. The Netherlands, through Rijkswaterstaat in particular, mandated an extremely tough standard, the curve of which is shown in the gallery above.

Example of a fire stop fire-resistance rating test

Construction of a test sample consists of a mockup of a section of concrete floor, with typical mechanical and electrical utility components (pipes and cables) penetrating the floor assembly. A firestop mortar is applied around the penetrations.

The completed test sample is inserted into a furnace such that one side is exposed to a fire. The test is terminated when the fire stops successfully meet the test criteria in minimizing the amount of heat and smoke allowed to pass through the assembly, when the fire penetrates the fire stops. This determines the fire stop F-Rating. The length of time required for a penetrant or sample on average to exceed a specified average heat rise above ambient at any single location determines the duration for the FT Rating (Fire and Temperature). If a hose-stream test is passed afterwards, the rating can then be expressed as an FTH Rating (Fire, Temperature and Hose-stream). The lowest of the three determines the overall rating.

See also

 Building code
 Certification listing
 Construction
 Deutsches Institut für Bautechnik
 EN 16034
 Endothermic
 Fire protection
 Fireproofing
 Firestop
 Firestop pillow
 Firewall (construction)
 Intumescent
 Mortar (firestop)
 Passive fire protection

References

External links
 BAM Berlin
 Institute for Research in Construction/NRC
 iBMB TU Braunschweig. Technische Universität Braunschweig.
 Gütegemeinschaft Brandschutz im Ausbau
Fire Retardant Glass - UL9 Certified Fire Resistant glass in USA - 284 °F for 180 minutes

Passive fire protection
Rating